The Big Frog Wilderness was designated in 1984 and currently consists of . The Wilderness is managed by the United States Forest Service in Tennessee and is part of the National Wilderness Preservation System.

The highest elevation in the Big Frog Wilderness is the  peak of Big Frog Mountain in Tennessee.  Although not a high mountain, Big Frog seems to dominate the Wilderness because it stands alone.  The Wilderness borders the Cohutta Wilderness, which is located in Georgia.  The Georgia portion of the Big Frog Wilderness is the smallest wilderness area in Georgia.

See also
List of U.S. Wilderness Areas
Wilderness Act

External links 
Wilderness.net entry for the Big Frog Wilderness
Sherpa Guides entry for the Big Frog Wilderness
Map of the Tennessee portion of the Big Frog Wilderness

Protected areas of Fannin County, Georgia
IUCN Category Ib
Protected areas of the Appalachians
Protected areas of Polk County, Tennessee
Wilderness areas of Georgia (U.S. state)
Wilderness areas of Tennessee
Protected areas established in 1984
Chattahoochee-Oconee National Forest
Cherokee National Forest